Scott Wyatt may refer to:
 Scott Wyatt (politician), American politician in the Virginia House of Delegates
 Scott A. Wyatt (born 1951), composer of electroacoustic music
 Scott L. Wyatt, president of Southern Utah University